The year 1511 in science and technology included a number of events, some of which are listed here.

Cartography
 A form of the Bonne projection is used by Sylvano.

Mathematics
 Charles de Bovelles publishes Géométrie en françoys, the first scientific work printed in French.

Births
 September 29(?) – Michael Servetus, Aragonese polymath (died 1553)
 October 22 – Erasmus Reinhold, German astronomer and mathematician (born 1511)

Deaths 
 Matthias Ringmann, German geographer (born 1482)

References

 
16th century in science
1510s in science